Ernest Bertrand,  (December 14, 1888 – October 11, 1958) was a Canadian politician.

Born in Somerset, Quebec, he was first elected to the House of Commons of Canada representing the Quebec riding of Laurier in the 1935 federal election. A Liberal, he was re-elected in 1940, 1945, and 1949. He was the Minister of Fisheries, Minister of Fisheries (Acting), and Postmaster General in the cabinet of Mackenzie King.

A lawyer by training, he had served as Senior Crown Prosecutor before entering politics, and had been an associate of Charles Trudeau.

References

1888 births
1958 deaths
Liberal Party of Canada MPs
Members of the House of Commons of Canada from Quebec
Members of the King's Privy Council for Canada
20th-century Canadian lawyers